Bothrops itapetiningae, or the São Paulo lancehead, is a species of venomous snake in the  family Viperidae. It is endemic to Brazil.

Geographic range
It is found in the Brazilian states of Goiás, Minas Gerais, Mato Grosso, Santa Catarina, and São Paulo. The type locality is Itapetininga, a municipality in the State of São Paulo [Brazil].

References

Further reading
 Boulenger GA. 1907. Description of a new Pit-Viper from Brazil. Annals and Magazine of Natural History. Seventh Series. 20: 338. ("Lachesis itapetiningæ" )

itapetiningae
Snakes of South America
Endemic fauna of Brazil
Reptiles of Brazil
Reptiles described in 1907
Taxa named by George Albert Boulenger